"She's a Lady" is a song written by Paul Anka and released on his album Paul Anka '70s (RCA 4309, 1970). The most successful recording was performed by Tom Jones and released at the beginning of 1971. It is Jones's highest-charting single in the U.S. (and his final Billboard Top Ten hit).

Chart performance
"She's a Lady" hit #1 in Cash Box magazine for a week and spending one week at #2 on the Billboard Hot 100 chart, behind "Me and Bobby McGee" by Janis Joplin.  The song was also a #4 hit on the US Billboard Easy Listening chart. Billboard ranked it as the #25 song for 1971.  In Canada, the single reached #1 on the RPM 100 national singles chart.

Paul Anka's recording of the song 
The song was re-released in 2013 on Paul Anka's " Duets" CD with a new rendition featuring Tom Jones.  Anka rewrote the first verse of the song (recorded with Jones) because he disliked its chauvinistic sentiments.

B-side track
The single's B-side track was "My Way" whose lyrics were also written by Paul Anka.

Chart history

Weekly charts

Year-end charts

Cover versions
The song has been covered multiple times. The more notable versions include:
 In 1973 as 'C'est Ma Lady', a single by Quebecois singer Jean Nichol.
 In 2007 as a single by Dutch singer Jeroen van der Boom.
 In 2018 as 'Lady Graveyard' by British band Luminous Bodies.
 In 2021 from album "Diamonds Unlocked II" by Axel Rudi Pell

Appearances in other media
Film:
 1973 film That Man Bolt. Sung by Samantha Nightingale (Teresa Graves) in a Nightclub sequence.
 1995 film To Wong Foo, Thanks for Everything! Julie Newmar. "She's a Lady" was re-released in Europe in 1995. The single included remixes by American DJ Junior Vasquez.
 1993 film Wilder Napalm.
 1996 film Bound.
 1998 film Fear and Loathing in Las Vegas.
 1998 film Così ridevano.
 1999 film Agnes Browne.
 2000 film Miss Congeniality.
 2002 film The Wild Thornberrys Movie.
 2003 film Bend It Like Beckham.
 2006 film Flushed Away. Hugh Jackman's character Roddy St. James sings it in the film, but Jones' version is in the soundtrack.
 2009 film Madea Goes to Jail.
 2014 film The Little Rascals Save the Day.

Television:
 The song was featured in the 2003 episode of Futurama "Bend Her".
 The song and title was spoofed in the short-lived 2004 reality show called He's a Lady on TBS.
 The song was used in the 2009 Trop50 orange juice commercial featuring Kyra Sedgwick.
 The song is also used in TV spots for the British sitcom Keeping Up Appearances.
 The song is used for the commercial of Lacoste Inspiration in 2006
 In Season 4 of the American Dancing With the Stars, Laila Ali and Maksim Chmerkovskiy danced a Cha-Cha-Cha to this song in week 9 of competition.
 In Season 14 of the American Dancing With the Stars, Katherine Jenkins, Mark Ballas and Tristan MacManus danced a Cha-Cha-Cha to this song in week 8 of competition.
 In the last edition of The Weakest Link, at the end of the episode, a montage of Weakest Link moments were shown while "She's a Lady" was playing while the clips were being shown.
 In Season 14 of America's Got Talent, singer under the name of Gingzilla performed the song at her audition, winning four 'yeses' from the judges.

Other:
 This song is currently the introduction for Kate Voegele on her 'Lift Me Up' tour.
 The song is featured in the YouTuber JonTron's video about the NES game Nightshade, in which Jon sings a slowed down version of the song while destroying the game cartridge.

References

External links
 

1971 singles
Paul Anka songs
Songs written by Paul Anka
Tom Jones (singer) songs
Cashbox number-one singles
Number-one singles in Australia
RPM Top Singles number-one singles
Parrot Records singles
1970 songs